The mayor of Makati is the head of the executive branch of Makati's government. The mayor holds office at the Makati City Hall.

Like all local government heads in the Philippines, the mayor is elected via popular vote, and may not be elected for a fourth consecutive term (although the former mayor may return to office after an interval of one term). In case of death, resignation or incapacity, the vice mayor becomes the mayor.

List

 Died in office. 
 Served in acting capacity. 
 Resigned.

References

Makati
 
Makati